Bloodstream refers to vascular circulation.

Bloodstream may also refer to

 "Bloodstream" (song), 2014 song by Ed Sheeran
 "Bloodstream", 2005 song by Stateless from The Bloodstream EP
 "Bloodstream", 2017 song by The Chainsmokers on Memories...Do Not Open